This is a list of horse mills that exist or are known to have existed.

Belgium

Channel Islands

Croatia

England

France

Hungary

Scotland

Serbia

Spain

Wales

United States

See also

 The International Molinological Society
 Museum of Scottish Country Life

References
 Animal-Powered Machines, J. Kenneth Major. Shire Album 128 – Shire Publications 1985. 
 Water-mills, windmills and horse-mills of South Africa, James Walton. C Struik Publishers, 1974. 

Horse mills
Animal engines
Grinding mills